Debbie Bovee (born February 26, 1954) is an American politician and a Democratic member of the Wyoming House of Representatives for District 36.

Elections

2016
Incumbent Republican Representative Gerald Gay initially ran unopposed for a fourth consecutive term.  However, Bovee ran as a write-in candidate during the Democratic primary, and received enough votes to qualify for the general election. Bovee defeated Gay with 53% of the vote.

References

External links
Profile from Ballotpedia

Living people
Democratic Party members of the Wyoming House of Representatives
People from Laramie, Wyoming
21st-century American politicians
21st-century American women politicians
1954 births
People from Casper, Wyoming